Pieter Cornelis Martijn van den Hoogenband (born 14 March 1978) is a Dutch retired swimmer. He is a triple Olympic champion and former world record holder.

Early life
Born in Maastricht, Limburg, he is the son of Cees-Rein van den Hoogenband and Astrid Verver, a former Dutch 800 m freestyle silver medalist at the European Junior Championships. He has a younger brother.

He grew up in Geldrop, where he swam for PSV Eindhoven.  His father is a team doctor with the professional football team of the same club.

Russian swimmer and four-time Olympic gold medalist Alexander Popov was his role model.

Swimming career

Early career
In 1993, Van den Hoogenband achieved his first success, performing well on the European Youth Olympic Days. Before the Atlanta Games, Astrid van den Hoogenband, who was coaching the Dutch team, became frustrated with the swimmers representing the Netherlands, feeling they had much potential but would not be able to live up to it due to lack of adequate support. She pleaded with Cees to take action, as he carried much weight from his professional connections.  After Astrid threatened to remove Pieter from the sport, Cees created a small foundation and signed up 20 initial sponsors who each paid $2,500 to fund a team trainer. The Dutch swimming team eventually signed contracts with Philips, Nike, and Speedo. Enough funds were raised to open a swim school in Eindhoven, Van den Hoogenband's place of residence. The team eventually grew to ten. Pieter remained the Netherlands' brightest star, and along with fellow Dutch Inge de Bruijn brought the Netherlands many victories in the sport. 

Van den Hoogenband is the only swimmer in history who has managed to win both the 100–200 metre freestyle double at the Olympics and also repeat as 100 freestyle champion at the Olympics. His three Olympic gold are the only three won by a Dutch male pool swimmer.

1996 Olympics
Van den Hoogenband's international breakthrough came at the 1996 Summer Olympics in Atlanta. Only 18 years old, he exceeded the expectations of many by finishing 4th in both the 100 m and 200 m freestyle. He won the 50 m freestyle B final, and finished 5th in the 4×100 m freestyle relay, 7th in the 4×200 m freestyle relay, and 10th in the 4×100 m medley relay.

Later career

1998 World championships

At the 1998 World Aquatics Championships in Perth, Australia, Van den Hoogenband won bronze medal in the 200 metre freestyle and silver in the 4×200 m freestyle relay.

2000 Olympics

After winning 6 gold medals at the 1999 European Championships, Van den Hoogenband was one of the favourites at the 2000 Summer Olympics, but his adversaries were formidable. In the 200 m freestyle he faced the world record holder, Australian youngster Ian Thorpe, favourite of the home crowd in Sydney. In the semi-finals, Van den Hoogenband set a new world record, but Thorpe countered with a time only 0.02 s slower. In an exciting final, Van den Hoogenband equalled his time from the semi-finals to win the gold medal. In the 100 m freestyle, Van den Hoogenband again set a world record in the semi-finals and won his second gold medal, defeating the 1992 and 1996 champion, Alexander Popov. His 100 m world record stood until 21 March 2008 and was broken by France's Alain Bernard (47.60). Van den Hoogenband won two more medals, both bronze, in the 50 m freestyle and the 4×200 m freestyle relay, in which he was the final swimmer.

Van den Hoogenband was named Dutch sportsman of the year in 1999, 2000 and 2004, World Swimmer of the Year in 2000, and European Swimmer of the Year in 1999, 2000, 2002 and 2004.

2001 World championships

At the 2001 World Championships in Fukuoka, Japan, Van den Hoogenband won four silver medals in the 50 m, 100 m, 200 m freestyle events and 4×100 m freestyle relay.

2003 World Championships

At the 2003 World Championships in Barcelona he split a 46.70 in the medley relay which stood as the fastest 100 m freestyle split until it was topped in 2008 by the French relay veteran Frédérick Bousquet, at 46.63 seconds. Van den Hoogenbands' 46.70, however, remained as the fastest textile relay split until it was topped in 2015 by Cameron McEvoy of Australia.   He had disappointing performances in both the 100 and 200 freestyle events though, finishing runner up to Alexander Popov and Ian Thorpe respectively, with considerably slow times.   His times from previous meets in the past year, and earlier rounds of the championships, would have won both events.  His winning time in the 200 freestyle at the 2002 European Championships was faster than Ian Thorpe's winning time at these Championships, but Pieter went about 2 whole seconds slower this time around.  His time in the semis of the 100 freestyle at these Championships would have won the final of that event as well (won by Alexander Popov), and his 100 free relay split (with nearly a second gain from a rolling start) was 2 whole seconds faster.

2004 Olympics

At the 2004 Summer Olympics in Athens, he won a gold medal in the 100 m freestyle and two silvers in the 200 m freestyle and the 4 × 100 m freestyle relay, swimming the anchor leg in 46.79 which was the 2nd fastest split in history. By finishing ahead of Michael Phelps in both the 200 m freestyle and the 4×100 m freestyle relay, he is the only swimmer to ever beat Phelps twice in Olympic competition.   While technically the second was a relay, his split was faster by a large margin, and the margin of beating the U.S team by a far smaller one.

2007 World Championships
At the 2007 World Championships in Melbourne, Australia, Van den Hoogenband won a silver medal in the 200 m freestyle behind Michael Phelps.

He holds by a large margin the all-time record for most runner up finishes at the World Championships without winning.

2008 Olympics
Van den Hoogenband returned to the Olympic Games in 2008 in Beijing and finished fifth in the 100 m freestyle. He retired after the race. In the semifinals he broke his own national record that stood from 2000 Summer Olympics bringing it to 47.68 s.

In making the 100 m freestyle final, Van den Hoogenband became the first swimmer to make the finals in the same event four times.

In December of the same year, he announced his retirement.

Post-swimming career 
Van den Hoogenband continues to swim recreationally and he remains active in the sports industry. He has served as a commentator for many swimming events, including the 2012 Summer Olympics. The swimming arena in the sporting centre of Eindhoven was named the "Pieter van den Hoogenband Zwemstadion".

Personal life
Van den Hoogenband was married to his longtime girlfriend Minouche Smit who is also a former swimmer. They have a daughter Daphne (born 23 June 2007) and a son Sander (born 13 September 2009). In September 2012 the couple announced their divorce. Then Van den Hoogenband dated Ranomi Kromowidjojo, also a multiple Olympic gold medalist. Their relationship ended in 2014. On 16 September 2016 Van den Hoogenband married Marie-José Crooijmans.

Despite a fierce rivalry, Van den Hoogenband is a good friend of Australian Ian Thorpe.

See also
 Dutch records in swimming
 List of multiple Olympic medalists at a single Games

References

External links
 
 Zwemkroniek 

1978 births
Living people
Dutch male freestyle swimmers
Olympic swimmers of the Netherlands
Swimmers at the 2008 Summer Olympics
Swimmers at the 2004 Summer Olympics
Swimmers at the 2000 Summer Olympics
Swimmers at the 1996 Summer Olympics
Olympic gold medalists for the Netherlands
Olympic silver medalists for the Netherlands
Olympic bronze medalists for the Netherlands
World record setters in swimming
Sportspeople from Maastricht
People from Geldrop
Sportspeople from North Brabant
Olympic bronze medalists in swimming
World Aquatics Championships medalists in swimming
Medalists at the FINA World Swimming Championships (25 m)
European Aquatics Championships medalists in swimming
Medalists at the 2000 Summer Olympics
Medalists at the 2004 Summer Olympics
Olympic gold medalists in swimming
Olympic silver medalists in swimming
Maastricht University alumni
Swimming commentators
Goodwill Games medalists in swimming
Competitors at the 1998 Goodwill Games
Competitors at the 2001 Goodwill Games